Secker is a surname. Notable people with the surname include:

 Jayne Secker (born 1972), English journalist and newsreader
 Kathy Secker (1945–2015), British broadcaster
 Martin Secker (1882–1978), London publisher
 Patrick Secker (born 1956), Australian politician
 Thomas Secker (1693–1768), Archbishop of Canterbury